Leukocyte adhesion molecule deficiency is a rare autosomal recessive disorder characterized by recurrent bacterial and fungal infections and impaired neutrophil migration.

See also 
 Skin lesion
 Leukocyte adhesion deficiency

References 

Noninfectious immunodeficiency-related cutaneous conditions